Kolhumadulu Atoll (also known as Thaa Atoll) is an administrative division of the Maldives. It corresponds to the natural atoll of the same name. The ancient name of the island was Kolhumaduva during the time of King Koimala who united all atolls of the Maldives under one kingdom for the first time.

Traditionally, Maldivians call this atoll simply Kolhumadulu, without adding the word atholhu at the end. Thaa is the code letters assigned to the atoll and is sometimes used by tourists to refer to the atoll itself.

The waters surrounding this atoll are good fishing areas and some islands house fish processing plants.

Archaeology
Kolhumadulu Atoll comprises thirteen inhabitant islands. They are; Buruni [N-1], Vilifushi [N-2], Madifushi [N-3], Dhiyamigili [N-4], Guraidhoo [N-5], Kadoodhoo [N-6], Vandhoo [N-7], Hirilandhoo [N-8], Gaadhifushi [N-9], Thimarafushi [N-10], Veymandoo [N-11], Kinbidhoo [N-12] and Omadhoo [N13].
There are important Buddhist archaeological remains in the island of Kinbidhoo, including a large ruined stupa. These were explored by the late Muhammad Ismail Didi. A report on the survey was published in the book Divehi Tārīkhah Au Alikameh.

References
 Divehi Tārīkhah Au Alikameh. Divehi Bahāi Tārikhah Khidmaiykurā Qaumī Markazu. Reprint 1958 edn. Malé 1990. 
 Divehiraajjege Jōgrafīge Vanavaru. Muhammadu Ibrahim Lutfee. G.Sōsanī.
 Xavier Romero-Frias, The Maldive Islanders, A Study of the Popular Culture of an Ancient Ocean Kingdom. Barcelona 1999.
 Ministry of Atolls, Maladives: http://www.atolls.gov.mv/islands.asp?atoll_letter=N&islandcode=N12&atolldhiv=Thaa

Atolls of the Maldives

dv:ކޮޅުމަޑުލު